True Tides, are an Irish band originating in Cork composed of brothers Eoin (guitarist and backing vocalist) and Cian (vocalist and guitarist) and Conor McSweeney (percussionist). The band released their first single 'Higher' in April, 2018. The band is signed to Warner Music Ireland and managed by Lars Kaye. In May, 2022 the band released its single 'Beating Heart'. Concerning genre the band's style has been described as synth pop by music critics. The band members are each alumni of Cork School of Music. In 2021 the band's single 'I Can't Wait' was nominated for the RTÉ choice music prize.

References 

Irish musical groups
Musical groups from Cork (city)
Warner Music Group artists